And the Singer Sings His Song is a compilation album by Neil Diamond released by MCA Records in 1976.  It peaked at number 102 on the Billboard 200 chart. Music critic Shawn M. Haney referred to the album as "a somewhat entertaining collection of Neil Diamond's lesser-known melodies" and that "the songs are charming, romantic, and easy to dance to. Perfect for a getaway excursion from reality and off to your favorite beached island".

Track listing
All tracks written by Neil Diamond.

References

Neil Diamond compilation albums
1977 live albums
Columbia Records live albums
Albums recorded at the Greek Theatre (Los Angeles)
Albums produced by Robbie Robertson